Lonny Kellner (8 March 1930 – 22 January 2003) was a German singer and actress. She was married to Peter Frankenfeld.

Selected filmography
 Queen of the Arena (1952)
 Dancing Stars (1952)
 The Flower of Hawaii (1953)
 Money from the Air (1954)
 Don't Worry About Your Mother-in-Law (1954)
 The Perfect Couple (1954)
 Music, Music and Only Music (1955)
 I'll See You at Lake Constance (1956)
 Love, Summer and Music (1956)
 Tired Theodore (1957)

References

Bibliography
Gerd Holler. ''Josef Meinrad: "Da streiten sich de Leut herum ...". Amalthea, 1995.

External links

1930 births
2003 deaths
German film actresses
German television actresses
20th-century German women singers
People from Remscheid